Domagoj Duvnjak (born 1 June 1988) is a Croatian professional handball player for THW Kiel and the Croatia national team. Duvnjak is regarded as one of the best handball players of all time alongside fellow Croatian Ivano Balić.

He became a member of the Croatia national team at the 2008 Summer Olympics in Beijing, China. He also represented Croatia at the 2012, where Croatia won bronze, and 2016 Olympics.  On 26 January 2014, he was named the IHF World Player 2013.

In August 2009, Duvnjak signed a three-year contract with HSV Hamburg worth €2.25 million, including a transfer fee of €1.1 million, making him – at age 21 – the most expensive handball player in history of the sport.

Awards and accomplishments

Club
RK Zagreb
Croatian League: 2006–07, 2007–08, 2008–09
Croatian Cup: 2007, 2008, 2009

HSV Hamburg
EHF Champions League: 2013
Bundesliga: 2010–11
DHB-Pokal: 2010
DHB-Supercup: 2009, 2010

THW Kiel
EHF Champions League: 2020
Bundesliga: 2014–15, 2019–20, 2020–21
DHB-Pokal: 2017, 2019, 2022
DHB-Supercup: 2014, 2015, 2020, 2021, 2022
EHF Cup: 2019

Individual
Dražen Petrović Award (2007)
Bundesliga Ideal Team (2011)
Best Croatian handball player by SN & CHF: 2011, 2012, 2014, 2015
World Championship All-Star Team (2013)
Bundesliga Player of the Season (2013)
Handball-Planet.com's World's Best Handball Player (2013)
IHF World Player of the Year (2013)
European Championship All-Star Team (2014)
World Championship All-Star Team (2017)
Most Valuable Player (MVP) of the European Championship: 2020
Croatian Sportsman of the Year (2020)

References

External links

hrs

1988 births
Living people
Sportspeople from Đakovo
Croatian male handball players
Olympic handball players of Croatia
Handball players at the 2008 Summer Olympics
Handball players at the 2012 Summer Olympics
Handball players at the 2016 Summer Olympics
RK Zagreb players
Olympic bronze medalists for Croatia
Olympic medalists in handball
Medalists at the 2012 Summer Olympics
Handball-Bundesliga players
THW Kiel players
Expatriate handball players
Croatian expatriate sportspeople in Germany